A list of films produced in South Korea in 1990:

External links
1990 in South Korea

 1990-1995 at www.koreanfilm.org

1990
South Korean
1990 in South Korea